Al-Nābigha al-Jadī (النابغة الجعدي, d. c. 60/680 or some years later) was an early Islamic poet.

Biography

He first appears in the historical record as part of the deputation by the Banū Jada to the Prophet, which probably took place in 9/630, and which led to his conversion to Islam. He and his tribe migrated to al-Baṣra during the period of conquests. At al-Nukhayla and Ṣiffin he fought on the side of Alī. Correspondingly, he composed poems in praise of Alī and the allied Ibn al-Zubayr. In consequence, Muāwiya confiscated his property in Medina and he went to Iṣfahān. Sometime between 63/683 and 65/685, al-Nābigha reluctantly pledged allegiance to Abdallāh b. al-Zubayr.

His date and place of death are unknown, with various guesses being made by scholars, ranging across 63/683×79/698-99, in Iṣfahān or Kurāsān.

Work

Nābigha is noted for a series of hijā’ (satirical verse contests) with Aws b. Maghrā’ and al-Akhṭal c. 40/660, probably in al-Baṣra; and with Sawwār b. Awfā and his wife Laylā al-Akhyaliyya, apparently between 40/660 and 63/683. In the latter case, the flyting began between Sawwār and Nābigha, but Laylā took over her husband's part on account of her greater poetic skill; the context for the flyting was the parties diametrically opposite political affiliations—there are even reports, unlikely to be true, of Laylā planning to hunt Nābigha down and kill him. 'By all accounts, Laylā is considered to have come out victorious and to have shamed al-Nābigha.'

Nābigha's work includes a heartfelt lament for the death of his son Muḥārib and younger brother Waḥwaḥ, and a meditation on the frailty of human life in the face of death.

On the conquest of Khorasan, Nābigha made the following verse: 'O men, do you not see how Persia has been ruined and its inhabitants humiliated? They have become slaves who pasture your sheet, as if their kingdom was a dream'.

Editions

 Le poesie di an-Nābiġah al-Ǧadī, ed. and trans. by Maria Nallino, Studi orientali pubblicati a cura della Scuola orientale, 2 (Rome: Bardi, 1953)
 Shir al-Nābigha al-Jadī, ed. by Abd al-Azīz Rabaḥ (Damascus: al-Maktab al-Islāmī, 1384/1964)
 Dīwān al-Nābigha al-Jadī, ed. by Wāḍiḥ al-Ṣamad (Beirut: Dār Ṣādir, 1998)

Studies

 Maria Nallino, 'An-Nābiġah al-Ǧadī e le sue poesie', Revista degli studi orientali, 14 (1933–34), 135-90, 380-432

References

Arab politicians
7th-century births
7th-century deaths
7th-century Arabs
Arab Muslims
7th-century Arabic poets